7–8 The Shambles is an historic pair of buildings in the English city of York, North Yorkshire. Grade II* listed buildings dating to the early and late 15th century, they are located in The Shambles.

Number 8 is the older house, and was built in the early 1400s.  It originally had one room on each of its three storeys, with a courtyard behind, but in the 16th century, the yard was infilled with a two-storey extension.  In about 1700, the extension was reduced in length, and a further extension was added, which included a kitchen.  In the 19th century, the level of the second floor was raised.

Number 7 was built in the late 1400s, filling the space between number 8 and a now-demolished building.  Like number 8, it is of three storeys, each of which is jettied.  Each floor is divided into three rooms, one behind another, although the position of the partitions has been altered over time.  In the 18th century, the rearmost bay of the building was shortened.  Inside, there is a 17th century chimney breast, built of brick, and much of the original timber framing survives. The fireplace on the first floor is original.

Both buildings have been converted into shops, with an office on the top floor.  Since 2002, the shops have been occupied by Monk Bar Chocolatiers.

Gallery

References

07–08
Houses in North Yorkshire
Buildings and structures in North Yorkshire
15th-century establishments in England
Grade II* listed buildings in York
Grade II* listed houses
15th century in York
Timber framed buildings in Yorkshire